Woodland Rail, LLC is a non-carrier railroad company that owns an  rail line located in the state of Maine and province of New Brunswick. It was formed in 2012 as a subsidiary company of Woodland Pulp, LLC, which owns and operates a pulp mill in the Woodland neighborhood of the town of Baileyville, Maine.

Woodland Rail connects a pulp mill in Baileyville, Maine with the Milltown Spur, owned by the New Brunswick Southern Railway (NBSR), at the midpoint of the Salmon Falls Railroad Bridge, which crosses the St. Croix River and the Canada–US border between Calais, Maine and St. Stephen, New Brunswick.

Woodland Rail has contracted Eastern Maine Railway to operate the line.

History
In 2012 Woodland Rail, LLC was formed by its owner Woodland Pulp, LLC to purchase the Calais Industrial Track (former Calais Branch and Woodland Spur) from Pan Am Railways between Calais and Baileyville. This line was originally operated by the Maine Central Railroad (MEC) and later by Guilford Transportation Industries (GTI).

GTI had abandoned the Calais Branch west of Saint Croix Junction in 1985, leaving the remaining active rail line with a connection to Canadian Pacific Railway in St. Stephen, New Brunswick.  The CP line to St. Stephen was sold to New Brunswick Southern Railway (NBSR) in 1995.

Line description
The line runs in the St Croix River valley, crossing the Canada–US border at three locations.

Calais Branch
This portion was formerly part of the easternmost section of the Calais Branch.

Another  of the former Calais Branch between St. Croix Junction and Ayers Junction remains in place (see rail banking) but is not in service.  This track is currently owned by the Maine Department of Transportation in order to preserve the rail infrastructure should service be restored to the port of Eastport.

Woodland Spur
From St. Croix Junction, the line continues southwest up the St. Croix River valley as the Woodland Spur.  at Baring, Maine, the line  crosses from the south (west) bank of the St. Croix River to the north (east) bank at Upper Mills, New Brunswick on the Baring Railroad Bridge.

See also

United States Surface Transportation Board Docket No. FD 35628
Canadian Transportation Agency Decision No. 245-R-2012

References

Maine railroads
New Brunswick railways
Railway companies established in 2012
Transportation in Washington County, Maine
Transport in Charlotte County, New Brunswick